Samuel Busich (November 17, 1913 – February 1, 1991) was an American football end in the National Football League for the Boston Redskins, Cleveland Rams, and the Detroit Lions. He also played professional basketball for the Columbus Athletic Supply in the National Basketball League for one game in 1937–38. Busich played both sports collegiately at Ohio State University.

Some sources say this athlete's name was Peter Paul Basich, though no newspaper or third party historical records have yet been found to verify that. Most sources point to his name being Samuel Busich.

References

1913 births
1991 deaths
American football wide receivers
Basketball players from Ohio
Boston Redskins players
Cleveland Rams players
Columbus Athletic Supply players
Detroit Lions players
Guards (basketball)
Ohio State Buckeyes football players
Ohio State Buckeyes men's basketball players
Players of American football from Ohio
Sportspeople from Lorain, Ohio